Thyone roscovita is a species of sea cucumber in the family Phyllophoridae. It is a suspension feeder and catches food particles floating past with its branched feeding tentacles.

Description
The general colour is pinkish-grey or pinkish-brown, with scattered darker brown and opaque spots. The body has a thick cuticle, and is densely covered with yellowish, flat-topped tube feet. The anterior (front) end has a mouth surrounded by a ring of ten branching tentacles, and the plume of tentacles is often the only part of the animal visible, the body being buried in the sediment.

Distribution and habitat
Thyone roscovita is native to the north-eastern Atlantic Ocean, the North Sea, the English Channel and the Mediterranean Sea. Its range extends from the Shetland Isles and the coasts of Britain and Ireland to the Bay of Biscay and the western Mediterranean Sea. Less frequently, it tucks itself into a rock crevice, with just its tentacles projecting.

Ecology
Thyone roscovita unfurls its oral tentacles and uses them to catch organic particles floating past. The smallest branches have adhesive papillae to which the particles stick. The tentacles are retracted in a predetermined order to transfer any food caught to the mouth. The sexes are separate in this species. The gametes are liberated into the water column where fertilisation takes place. The barrel-shaped larvae have a short planktonic life before sinking to the seabed and undergoing metamorphosis into juvenile sea cucumbers.

References

Phyllophoridae
Fauna of the Atlantic Ocean
Fauna of the Mediterranean Sea
Animals described in 1889